Riomaggiore railway station (Stazione di Riomaggiore) is located on the Genoa–Pisa railway, Italy. It serves Riomaggiore, which is one of the five towns of the Cinque Terre.

History
The station was inaugurated on 24 October 1874, at the same time as the – line.
 
Associated work in the station area included the construction of the portal of the Batternara-Riofinale tunnel with a polycentric arch, which required changes to the adjacent areas, and the construction of a new 2-storey passenger building, a goods warehouse with a loading dock and the current underpass.
 
The station was reclassified as a halt on 14 December 2003.
 
In June and July 2011, the station was also served by the Treni del Mare ("trains of the sea") managed by the private company Arenaways, which became bankrupt shortly afterwards.

Buildings and infrastructure 
The station has two platforms; platform 1 is used mainly by trains to La Spezia and platform 2 by trains to Genoa. 

An enclosed pedestrian path in the tunnel, running parallel to the track, gives access to the lower part of the historic centre at the mouth of the stream that runs through it. A second pedestrian path, which connects Riomaggiore with Manarola and was built in the open when the line was built, is a well-known tourist destination and is now called the Via dell'Amore ("the Way of Love""). It can normally be used for a fee, but it has been closed for some years due to a serious collapse of the rocks above.

Services 
The station, which RFI manages and classified in 2008 in the silver category, has:
  Ticket counter managed by Cinque Terre National Park.
  ticket machines
  toilets
  bar.

Rail services
The station is served by Trenitalia regional services operated under a contract with the region of Liguria.

References

Footnotes

Sources
 
 
 
 
 
 
 

Railway stations in Liguria
Railway stations opened in 1874